Ibaka Town is a commercial town of the Oron people and located in Mbo local government area of Akwa Ibom state in Nigeria.

References 

Places in Oron Nation
Villages in Akwa Ibom